Doug Rupe is an Australian Paralympic athletics silver medalist.

He competed at the 1976 Toronto Games in three athletics events. He won a silver medal in the Men's High Jump A.

References 

Paralympic athletes of Australia
Athletes (track and field) at the 1976 Summer Paralympics
Paralympic silver medalists for Australia
Living people
Year of birth missing (living people)
Medalists at the 1976 Summer Paralympics
Paralympic medalists in athletics (track and field)
Australian male high jumpers
Paralympic high jumpers
High jumpers with limb difference